The pilot episodes (also known as the pilot season) are the first installments of the Ninjago: Masters of Spinjitzu computer-animated television series (titled Ninjago from the eleventh season onward). The series was created by Michael Hegner and Tommy Andreasen. It focuses on the adventures of six teenage ninja who live in the fictional world of Ninjago and fight against the forces of evil.

In the United States, the two pilot episodes of Ninjago: Masters of Spinjitzu, later split into four episodes in total, were shown on Cartoon Network on January 14, 2011. They were released in Europe on January 24, 2011. Due to the popularity of the pilot episodes, the first season titled Rise of the Snakes was launched from December 2011 to April 2012. The pilot episodes were released on DVD in March 2011, and the first season became available on DVD in Region 1 on June 26, 2012. Each pilot episode has a runtime of 11 minutes, totalling 22 minutes when combined into two episodes. The 22-minute format remained consistent throughout the series until the release of the eleventh season titled Secrets of the Forbidden Spinjitzu, when it was reduced to 11 minutes.

The pilot episodes introduce five of the show's six main teenage ninja characters named Kai, Cole, Jay, Zane and Nya and their wise master, Sensei Wu that would remain the central characters of the series. The storyline focuses on the ninja team's efforts to stop the villainous Lord Garmadon from obtaining the four Golden Weapons of Spinjitzu.

Voice cast

Main 
 Vincent Tong as Kai, the red ninja and Elemental Master of Fire
 Michael Adamthwaite as Jay, the blue ninja and Elemental Master of Lightning
 Brent Miller as Zane, the white ninja and Elemental Master of Ice
 Kirby Morrow as Cole, the black ninja and Elemental Master of Earth
 Kelly Metzger as Nya, Kai's sister
 Paul Dobson as Sensei Wu, the wise teacher of the ninja
 Mark Oliver as Lord Garmadon, the main antagonist of the pilot episodes

Recurring 

 Michael Kopsa as Samukai, the Skulkin leader

 Brian Drummond as Nuckal and Kruncha

Production

Development 
The pilot episodes were released after two years of planning following a concept drawing by co-creator Tommy Andreasen that featured five elemental ninjas. Within the first year of development, further concept art was created that depicted the Skulkin and Lord Garmadon as the main antagonists. The concept work also included the idea of a fictional martial art that was initially called "Spinjago" and later renamed as "Spinjitzu". Brothers Dan and Kevin Hageman developed the storyline as a serialised drama set within a fantasy world that would be similar to "one giant movie or a miniseries". The Pilot Episodes introduce skeletons as the main antagonists, which was the result of extensive research with children conducted by The Lego Group during the development of the Lego Ninjago brand. Skeletons were chosen as the preferred option, as the children considered them to be "real" fantasy villains.

Animation 
The series was animated from the pilot episodes until the tenth season by Wil Film ApS in Denmark.

Launch 
The television series was designed to launch the Lego Ninjago product line, which runs alongside the series. It was originally planned as a three-year project that was intended to end after the second season. However, due to its popularity and success in the first year, the series was continued indefinitely and has been in production ever since.

Plot 
"Long before time had a name", the First Spinjitzu Master created the realm of Ninjago using the four Golden Weapons of Spinjitzu: the Scythe of Quakes, the Shurikens of Ice, the Nunchucks of Lightning and the Sword of Fire. Before he passed, his two sons swore to protect the weapons from evil, but the older brother, Garmadon, was consumed by darkness and aimed to wield all four weapons so that he could recreate Ninjago in his own image. In the ensuing battle between brothers, the younger brother Wu cast Garmadon down to the Underworld and hid the weapons across Ninjago, placing a dragon to guard each hiding spot.

In anticipation of Garmadon's return, Sensei Wu seeks out four talented young teenagers to master the art of Spinjitzu and find the Golden Weapons before Garmadon and his Skulkin Army can claim them. Wu recruits Kai, a young blacksmith and trains him to become a ninja at the Monastery of Spinjitzu. There he meets three other ninja: Cole, Jay, and Zane. The ninja team up to find the four Golden Weapons and save Kai's sister, Nya, who has been kidnapped by the Skulkin. They find the Scythe of Quakes at the Caves of Despair, learning spinjitzu along the way. They then find the Shurikens of Ice and the Nunchucks of Lightning, confronting each dragon in the process. That night Kai retrieves the Sword of Fire from the Fire Temple, and frees his sister, but is confronted by the shadow of Garmadon. Although Wu arrives at the temple and fights off his brother's shadow, the Skulkin ambush Cole, Jay and Zane and steal the other three Golden Weapons.

Sensei Wu decides to enter the Underworld with the Sword of Fire, believing that this is the only way to stop Garmadon. The ninja follow him by crossing between realms on the backs of the dragons, who agree to help them. In the Underworld, Samukai, the Skulkin leader, attacks Wu but the ninja use Spinjitzu to create a Tornado of Creation, which defeats the skulkin. Samukai picks up the four Golden Weapons, but they are too powerful to be held together and they destroy him. This creates a portal for Garmadon to use to escape from the Underworld. Back in Ninjago, the ninja celebrate their temporary victory, with the expectation that Garmadon will soon return.

Episodes

Reception

Accolades  
In 2012, the composers Michael Kramer and Jay Vincent won the BMI Film & TV Music Awards.

Critical reception 
Lien Murakami for Common Sense Media gave the show a 3 out of 5 star rating, commenting that it, "is packed with lots of cartoon martial arts battles involving ninjas, skeletons, and guardian monsters, but the action is completely bloodless and at times humorous." The review also noted that the show, "mainly focuses on the red "fire" ninja Kai and his hero's journey from hot-headed teen to focused team member. Older viewers will be familiar with this well-worn story." The review also remarked, "The animation is smooth and colorful, and the exciting martial arts sequences make the most of the blocky little characters and their "clip" hands. The plot moves along at a decent pace; if anything, it's sometimes a bit too fast. And characters learn lessons of teamwork and patience thanks to the wise and respectable Sensei Wu. Better still, it's full of silly, winking humor, thereby making the peril seem less intense."

Ratings 
The pilot episodes were the highest rated program with boys in their time slot across multiple airings.

Legacy 
Since the launch and success of the pilot episodes, the series has spawned a media franchise that includes video games, publications and theme park attractions and the production of the 2017 film The Lego Ninjago Movie, which was the third film of The Lego Movie franchise.

Other media 
The pilot episodes were followed by six 3 minute mini-movies that were released in 2011. The titles of the mini-movies were Flight of the Dragon Ninja, Secrets of the Blacksmith, The New Masters of Spinjitzu, Battle Between Brothers, Return to the Fire Temple and An Underworldly Takeover.

A video game based on the pilot special titled Lego Battles: Ninjago was released on April 12, 2011, exclusively for the Nintendo DS. It was also a spin-off sequel to Lego Battles.

See also 

 List of Ninjago characters

References

Primary

Secondary 

Pilot
2011 Canadian television seasons
2011 Danish television seasons
Ninjago